Claude Cerval (21 February 1921 – 25 July 1972) was a French film actor. He appeared in more than forty films from 1955 to 1971.

Filmography

References

External links
 

1921 births
1972 deaths
Male actors from Paris
French male film actors
20th-century French male actors